The Imperial Parliament of Ethiopia was the bicameral legislature of the Ethiopian Empire from 1931 to 1974. It consisted of the lower house, the Chamber of Deputies, and the upper house, Senate. The legislature was established in the 1931 Constitution, all members appointed, primarily by the Emperor of Ethiopia. The 1955 Constitution introduced elections to the lower chamber. The last elections took place in 1973. The legislature was abolished by Derg.

Senate
The Senate, Yaheg Mawos sena Meker-beth, was established in 1931. Initially, its members were appointed, and they came from the nobility, the aristocracy, cabinet ministers, and civil servants. The chamber was reformed in the 1955 constitution so that the members were appointed by aristocrats. In 1974, there were 125 members in the chamber.

Senate Presidents

Negash Bezabeh, 1942-1943
Blattengeta Lorenzo Taezaz, 1943-1944
Tsahafe Taezaz Wolde Maskal, ?-1945
Mangasha Jambare, 1945-1946
Ras Bidwoded Makonnen Endelkachew, 1957-1961
Ras Asrate Kassa, 1961-1964
Lt-Gen. Abey Abeba, 1964-1974
Sources:

Chamber of Deputies
The Chamber of Deputies, Yaheg Mamria Meker-beth, was established in 1931. Initially, the members were chosen by the Emperor of Ethiopia, the nobility and the aristocrats. The chamber was reformed in the 1955 constitution, and members were to be elected. In 1974, there were 250 members in the chamber.

Presidents of the Chamber of Deputies

Blattengeta Belatcho Yadete, ?-1945-?
Grazmatch Gebre Kristos Wolde Michael, ?-1953-?
Lij Haile Mariam Kebede, 1955-1958-?
Girma Wolde-Giorgis, 1961-1965
Fitawrari Bayissa Jemmo, ?-1966-1967
Ato Tadesse Taye, 1967-1969-?
Ato Seife Taddese, 1970-1974
Ato Abebe Wendimeneh, 1974

See also
Ethiopian Empire
List of legislatures by country

References

1931 establishments in Ethiopia
1974 disestablishments in Ethiopia
Defunct bicameral legislatures
Defunct national legislatures
Ethiopian_Empire
History of Ethiopia